Appeal For Redress is a group of United States military personnel opposed to the Iraq War. The group is sponsored by Iraq Veterans Against the War (IVAW), Military Families Speak Out, and Veterans for Peace (VFP). The group solicits members of the U.S. military to communicate the following message to the U.S. Congress:

As a patriotic American proud to serve the nation in uniform, I respectfully urge my political leaders in Congress to support the prompt withdrawal of all American military forces and bases from Iraq. Staying in Iraq will not work and is not worth the price. It is time for U.S. troops to come home.

On February 23, 2007, the group was featured on the CBS Evening News with Katie Couric. It was later featured on 60 Minutes.

See also
 Appeal for Courage - a group of military set up in favor of the war.

References

External links
 An Appeal for Redress, Group Website
 Iraq Veterans Against the War Group Website

Political advocacy groups in the United States
Veterans' organizations opposed to the Iraq War